Lok Wah South is one of the 37 constituencies in the Kwun Tong District of Hong Kong which was created in 1991.

The constituency loosely based on Hipway Towers, part of Lok Wah South Estate, Sau Mau Ping Disciplined Services Quarters and Wah Fung Gardens with an estimated population of 12,582.

Councillors represented

Election results

2010s

References

Constituencies of Hong Kong
Constituencies of Kwun Tong District Council
1991 establishments in Hong Kong
Constituencies established in 1991
Ngau Tau Kok